Freeland Park is an unincorporated town in Parish Grove Township, Benton County, in the U.S. state of Indiana. It is part of the Lafayette, Indiana Metropolitan Statistical Area.

History
Freeland Park was named for Antoine Freeland, the original owner of the town site. It stood at the terminus of the Freeland Park branch of the Chicago and Eastern Illinois Railroad.  A fire in 1914 badly damaged the town's business district.  In the 1920s Freeland Park had two grain elevators, a high school, a Presbyterian church and eight to ten businesses.

A post office was established at Freeland Park in 1901, and remained in operation until it was discontinued in 1957.

Geography
A small waterway known as Salmon Ditch runs just north of town and flows west into Illinois where it becomes Cole Creek.

References

External links

Unincorporated communities in Benton County, Indiana
Unincorporated communities in Indiana
Lafayette metropolitan area, Indiana